Rachmaninoff is a German produced vodka. The spirit is named after the Russian composer Sergei Rachmaninoff.

It is a low-budget vodka sold by Lidl supermarket. In the :International Wine and Spirit Competition it received a gold award in 2015, a silver award in 2016, and a silver award in 2018.

The brand makes both 37.5% and 40% strength vodka, (with red and blue coloured labels, respectively) as well as a range of alcopops.  The bottle's label suggests the use of Worcestershire sauce (Lea & Perrins being such a brand), to be used in the preparation of a Bloody Mary, using this brand of vodka.

References

German brands
German vodkas
Sergei Rachmaninoff